Eudocima anguina is a moth of the family Erebidae first described by William Schaus in 1911. It is found in South America and in most of Costa Rica.

References

anguina
Moths of Central America
Moths of South America
Moths described in 1911